The Town of Mosman Park is a local government area of Western Australia. It covers an area of approximately 4.3 km² in western metropolitan Perth, the capital of Western Australia and lies about 14 km southwest of the Perth CBD and 5 km from Fremantle.

History
The Buckland Hill Road District was created on 6 October 1899. It was renamed the Cottesloe Beach Road District on 2 July 1909, but reverted to the Buckland Hill name on 10 October 1930.

It was renamed the Mosman Park Road District on 12 February 1937. It became the Shire of Mosman Park with effect from 1 July 1961 following the passage of the Local Government Act 1960, which reformed all remaining road districts into shires. It assumed its current name when it was granted town status on 26 January 1962.

Wards
The town has six councillors and a mayor. The town is split into North and South wards.

Suburbs
Mosman Park is the only suburb within this municipality.

Population

Heritage listed places

As of 2023, 91 places are heritage-listed in the Town of Mosman Park, of which seven are on the State Register of Heritage Places, among them the Leighton Battery.

See also
 AmpFest, Youth and music festival overseen by the Town of Mosman Park

References

External links
 
 Local Government & Municipal Knowledge Base – Mosman Park Town Council Page
 The Grove Community History Library

 
Mosman Park